Uherčice may refer to places in the Czech Republic:

Uherčice (Břeclav District), a municipality and village in the South Moravian Region
Uherčice (Znojmo District), a municipality and village in the South Moravian Region
Úherčice, a municipality and village in the Pardubice Region